Stone High School is a public high school located in Wiggins, Mississippi, United States. It is the only high school in the Stone County School District.

History
Prior to federally mandated integration in 1969, Stone County maintained separate schools for white students and black students. Stone High School served the white students, while Stone County Training School, built in 1955 and renamed W.P. Locker High School in 1959, served the African-American students. After integration, Locker became Stone Middle School. Locker's principal, Needham Jones, a former Tuskegee airman, was demoted to assistant principal at Stone Middle, although he was more qualified than the white principal at Stone High. Jones sued and won, but retired rather than take the position of principal at Stone High.

In 2016, a group of white students at Stone High put a noose around a black student's neck. Local law enforcement discouraged the student's family from filing a report. The student was disciplined by the school and removed from the football team by coach John Feaster, the school's first African-American coach in any sport. In 2016, 75% of the school's 800 students were white.

A 2017 report showed that white students were 3.2 times more likely to be in an AP class than black students, and that black students were 3 times more likely to be disciplined than white students.

Notable alumni
Chris Boykin, television personality
Sammy Brown, professional football player
D.J. Davis, professional baseball player
Justin Evans, professional football player
Marcus Hinton, professional football player
Rebekah Jones, data scientist and geographer
Fred Lewis, professional baseball player
Stevon Moore, professional football player

Notable faculty
Ode Burrell, professional football player, coached at Stone High

References

External links 

 

Public high schools in Mississippi
Education in Stone County, Mississippi